Akeem Bloomfield (born 11 October 1997) is a Jamaican track and field athlete specializing in sprint events.

Career
Running for Auburn University under coach Henry Rolle, he finished second in the 400 meters at the 2018 NCAA Championships behind Michael Norman of USC.  His time of 43.94 ranks #17 on the all-time list, one of only 18 human beings to run the distance under 44 seconds.  15 days later, he signed a professional contract with Puma.  Less than a month later, Bloomfield ran 200 meters in 19.81, at the London Anniversary Games.  .  Bloomfield had never run under 20 seconds before, so his win was so unexpected, race announcers didn't even announce him as the winner until 20 seconds after the race when his name came up on the results display.  That time also ranked him on the top 25 all-time list, joining Michael Johnson and Isaac Makwala as the only men to make both the current 200 and 400 lists.

Earlier in the season, Bloomfield finished second to Norman at the 2018 NCAA Indoor Championships.  Norman set the world record of 44.52 in that race, Bloomfield's 44.86 ranks him at No. 6 on the all-time list and is the Jamaican indoor record.

Bloomfield had previously run for Kingston College.  At the 2015 Jamaican National Championships, Bloomfield set the Jamaican Junior Record for 400 meters at 44.93.

Statistics
Information from World Athletics profile or Track & Field Results Reporting System unless otherwise noted.

Personal bests

International championship results

Circuit wins

400 m
Diamond League
Rabat: 2018
London: 2019
Birmingham: 2019
World Indoor Tour
Glasgow: 2020

200 m
Diamond League
London: 2018

References

External links

Living people
1997 births
Jamaican male sprinters
Auburn University alumni
World Athletics Championships athletes for Jamaica
World Athletics Championships medalists
Sportspeople from Kingston, Jamaica
Auburn Tigers men's track and field athletes
21st-century Jamaican people